Photofission is a process in which a nucleus, after absorbing a gamma ray, undergoes nuclear fission and splits into two or more fragments. 

The reaction was discovered in 1940 by a small team of engineers and scientists operating the Westinghouse Atom Smasher at the company's Research Laboratories in Forest Hills, Pennsylvania. They used a 5 MeV proton beam to bombard fluorine and generate high-energy photons, which then irradiated samples of uranium and thorium.

Gamma radiation of modest energies, in the low tens of MeV, can induce fission in traditionally fissile elements such as the actinides thorium, uranium, plutonium, and neptunium. Experiments have been conducted with much higher energy gamma rays, finding that the photofission cross section varies little within ranges in the low GeV range.

 Baldwin  et al made measurements of the yields of photo-fission in uranium and thorium together with a search for photo-fission in other heavy elements, using continuous x-rays from a 100-Mev betatron. Fission was detected in the presence of an intense background of x-rays by a differential ionization chamber and linear amplifier, the substance investigated being coated on an electrode of one chamber. They deduced the maximum cross section being of the order of 5×10−26 cm2 for uranium and half that for thorium. In the other elements studied, the cross section must be below 10−29 cm2.

Photodisintegration
Photodisintegration (also called phototransmutation) is a similar but different physical process, in which an extremely high energy gamma ray interacts with an atomic nucleus and causes it to enter an excited state, which immediately decays by emitting a subatomic particle.

References 

Nuclear physics
Nuclear chemistry
Nucleosynthesis
Nuclear fission